Barnwell House, also known as Prospect Hill Plantation, is a historic home located at Adams Run, Charleston County, South Carolina. It consists of the front or main portion dating from 1878 and the rear section from early to mid-19th century. The main part is a -story building, with a stuccoed brick first story and weatherboarded upper story. The front façade features a one-story portico with a bell cast hip roof supported by two solid Doric order fluted columns. It was listed on the National Register of Historic Places in 1980.

References

Houses on the National Register of Historic Places in South Carolina
Houses completed in 1878
Houses in Charleston County, South Carolina
National Register of Historic Places in Charleston County, South Carolina